Madame Geneviève Pétau de Maulette, Lady Glenluce (c. 1563–1643) was a French noblewoman, tutor to Elizabeth of Bohemia, author and the second wife of John Gordon, D.D., Dean of Salisbury and Lord Glenluce and Longormes.

Biography 
Pétau was born in Brittany, France. Her parentage is not known for sure, but she was probably the daughter of François Pétau, seigneur de Maulette.

Pétau was raised a Protestant, and in 1594 she married Dr. John Gordon, a prominent Scottish reverend who was Gentleman of the Bedchamber to the French king.

Their son-in-law, Robert Gordon of Gordonstoun, wrote that she was the French teacher to the eldest daughter of King James I and Queen Anne of Denmark, Princess Elizabeth, and that her daughter Louisa, who he later married, was brought up with the princess in Lord Harrington's household.

Geneviève died on 6 December 1643 at Gordonstoun, Moray, and was buried at the Michael Kirk in the old churchyard of Oggston in the parish of Drainie, Moray.

She owned a portrait miniature of King James I in a case decorated with diamonds. She worked a suite of furniture at Gordonston in green tent stitch including bed, cupboard cloth, stools, chair and couch.

Works 
Lady Geneviève is remembered for her work in French entitled, Devoreux, Vertues Teares for the Losse of King Henry III of Fraunce, by a learned gentlewoman, Madame Geneviève Petau. The poem praises Henry III of France and an English nobleman, Walter Devereux. The work was written some time after the end of the siege of Rouen in late 1591 and before it was translated into English in 1597 by Gervase Markham.

Family 
Lady Geneviève and her husband had one child, Lucie or Louise (1597–1680), who married Sir Robert Gordon of Gordonstoun, fourth son of 12th Earl of Sutherland. Their daughter Katherine Gordon was mother of the Quaker Robert Barclay.

His daughter Elizabeth Gordon was born at Salisbury in January 1617. At her christening, the Earl of Hertford was a godfather, Lucy Russell, Countess of Bedford, and Jean Drummond, Countess of Roxburghe were godmothers.

References

Bibliography 
 
 
 

1560s births
1640s deaths
French nobility
French women writers
17th-century Scottish women